Jesse Aaron (1887–1979) was an American sculptor and wood carver. Aaron began making art in his early 80s. He rapidly gained recognition, earning a Visual Arts Fellowship from the National Endowment for the Arts. His work is held in the permanent collections of several museums including the High Museum of Art and the Smithsonian Museum of American Art.

Life 
Jesse Aaron was born on June 10, 1887, in Lake City, Florida. He was the eldest of twelve children born into a mixed race family descending from a Seminole grandmother and parents of African and European descent. His formal education ended in the first grade when his parents removed him from school to hire him out as a farm-laborer for seven dollars per month. He continued sporadic agricultural labor until 1908 when he attended a technical college for his baker's certification. From then Aaron began working as a cook for the Seaboard Coast Line Railroad system, operated several bake shops, cooked for Hotel Thomas in Gainesville, FL, and then for various hospitals and fraternities later in his career. When he could not find work cooking, he worked in cabinetmaking, which gave him the skills and inspiration for woodcarving and sculpture.

In 1912, shortly after becoming a certified baker, Aaron met Lee Anna, a school teacher, whom he would marry and together raise one daughter, Ida Aaron Wells. In the early 1930s, Aaron built a home for his family in Gainesville, Florida, where he lived for the rest of his life. In the mid-1960s he bought three acres of land east of Gainesville and created his own farm and nursery there. He sold flowers and seedlings from the nursery to supplement his income. However, in 1968, he was forced to sell the nursery to partially pay for his wife's cataract surgery.

Aaron died on October 17, 1979, and Lee Anna shortly after on December 25, 1985.

Career 
According to Aaron, desperation and divine intervention inspired him to carve wood. In 1968, after selling his farm to fund his wife's cataract operation, Aaron still did not have enough money to fully fund her surgery. As he recounted, at three o'clock in the morning on July 5, Aaron awoke to the voice of God commanding him to carve wood. This inspiration offered solutions both to Lee Anna's desperate need for surgery and Aaron's unemployment after losing his nursery. Thus, at 81 years old, Aaron began a new career as a sculptor.

Aaron's first carvings were on the trees surrounding his home in Gainesville. Aaron believed these trees and their carved faces to be protective. Aaron's first stand-alone carvings were carved from soft kindling wood that he got from a neighbor. Later, his more anthropomorphic wood sculptures, with their characteristically large, yellow eyes, would be sourced from the woods and swamps surrounding his property.

Process and materials 
Aaron had a similar artistic process to other southern African American wood carvers of the mid-twentieth century, such as Bessie Harvey, Ralph Griffin, Archie Byron, Elijah Pierce, and Ulysses Davis. Aaron would walk the swamp and forest to collect pieces of wood in which "he could bring forth human and animal shapes that, to him if not to anyone else, already existed." For the artist, there was a distinct difference between inspired and uninspired material and the power of distinguishing the two lay in his communion with God. He described his process by saying "I can see faces on anything. I can look at a tree stump and I know just how is gonna look 'fore I start, it all depends on what God has put there in the wood." Towards the end of his life, he would experience arthritic pain that prevented him from harvesting his own wood. Fruitlessly, he hired college students to help him source wood, complaining, "These guys don't know what to look for. They can't see it. Most of the time, what they bring to me I can't see nothing in it."

Aaron most often worked with untreated hardwoods, such as cedar and Cyprus, which are native to Florida and bug-resistant. He began by roughly shaping them with a chainsaw, then refined the pieces with hammers, chisels, and other hand-tools. He never painted, stained, or varnished the sculptures, but would often burn the surface of the wood to enhance color and texture. He created his iconic, large, aghast, yellow eyes from polyester resin. He also attached found objects, bones, old pipes, rusted guns, and hats to his pieces to further animate them.

His work ranged from pocket-sized sculptures to larger-than-life-sized tree trunks. Although it is difficult to estimate how many carvings were completed in his short eleven-year working period, several hundred examples of his work have survived, making it likely that he completed many more pieces than that.

Acclaim 
Approximately one month after Aaron began carving and displaying his work in his front yard, Stuart R. Purser, a professor of art at the University of Florida, stumbled upon his work. He arranged a visit with the artist and was quickly taken by Aaron's prowess. In October 1968, Purser organized Aaron's first solo exhibition at the University of Florida. Two years later, with the attention of University of Florida art historian and curator Roy Craven, Aaron had another gallery opening at the university. As Craven recalls, the gallery opened at 1:00 pm and all of Aaron's work was sold by 2:30 pm.

In 1975, Aaron was awarded the Visual Arts Fellowship from the National Endowment for the Arts, one of the highest honors that an artist can receive in the United States.

Exhibitions 
 Wood Sculpture by Jesse J. Aaron. 14 Oct - 3 Nov, 1970, University of Florida, College of Architecture and Fine Arts, Gainesville, FL. 
 Black Folk Art in America, 1930-1980. 15 Jan- 28 Mar, 1982, Corcoran Gallery of Art, Washington (D.C.) 
 Outside the Main Stream: Folk Art in Our Time, May- Aug 1988, High Museum of Art at Georgia-Pacific Center, Atlanta, GA. 
 Unsigned, Unsung.. Whereabouts Unknown!: Make-Do Art of the American Outlands. 5 Feb- 7 Mar, 1993, Florida State University Art Gallery and Museum, Tallahassee, FL.  
 Passionate Visions of the American South: Self-Taught Artists from 1940 to the Present, 23 Oct 1993- 30 Jan 1994, New Orleans Museum of Art, New Orleans, LA. 
 Southern Spirit: The Hill Collection, 21 Feb- 31 Mar, 2000, Museum of Art, Tallahassee, FL.  
 The Sculpture of Jesse Aaron. 9 Sep- 4 Nov 2000, Zora Neale Hurston National Museum of Fine Arts, Eatonville, FL.  
 A Return to January '82: The Corcoran Show Revisited, 22 Jan- 16 Mar, 2002, Luise Ross Gallery, New York, NY.  
 Southern Folk: Self-Taught Artists, 15 Nov, 2002- 5 Jan, 2003, Ormond Memorial Art Museum and Gardens, Ormond Beach, FL. 
 Coming Home: Self-Taught Artists, the Bible and the American South. 19 Jun- 13 Nov, 2004,  Art Museum of the University of Memphis, Memphis, TN.  
 Stories of Community: Self-Taught Art from the Hill Collection. 12 Aug- 30 Oct, 2004, Museum of Arts and Sciences, Macon, GA. 
 Amazing Grace: Self-Taught Artists from the Mullis Collection. 29 Sep, 2007- 6 Jan, 2008, Georgia Museum of Art, University of Georgia, Athens, GA.  
 Confluence. 27 May- 20 Sep 2016, Thomas Center Gallery, Gainesville, FL.  
 Cosmologies from the Tree of Life: Art from the African American South, 8 Jun- 17 Nov 2019, Virginia Museum of Fine Arts, Richmond, VA.
In the Presence of Our Ancestors: Southern Perspectives in African American Art. December 12, 2020 to December 5, 2021. Minneapolis Institute of Art. Minneapolis, MN.

Collections

 Minneapolis Institute of Art
 High Museum of Art
 Fine Arts Museums of San Francisco
 Virginia Museum of Fine Arts
 Smithsonian American Art Museum

References

1887 births
1979 deaths
20th-century American sculptors
American woodcarvers
People from Lake City, Florida
Place of death missing
Sculptors from Florida
National Endowment for the Arts Fellows
American male sculptors
20th-century American male artists